A kipper is a salted and smoked fish.

Kipper or Kippers may refer to:

Arts and entertainment
 Kipper the Dog, the title character of a children's book series by Mick Inkpen
 Kipper (TV series), an animated children's TV series
 Kipper Robinson, a character in The Magic Key children's  book series
 Kipper Herring, a fictional character in a Jeeves novel
 Kipper, a comic character in Penelope and Kipper
 Kipper, a fictional rock band from the film Confessions of a Pop Performer

People
Bob Kipper (born 1964), American baseball coach and former Major League Baseball relief pitcher
Irvin Kipper (1916–2016), American Air Force pilot and founder of Kip's Toyland
Josefin Kipper (1928–1981), Austrian actress
Thornton Kipper (1928–2006), American Major League Baseball pitcher
Kipper Cariappa (Kodandera Madappa Cariappa, 1898–1993), Commander-in-Chief of the Indian Army
Miikka Kiprusoff, Finnish hockey player nicknamed "Kipper"
Christopher Kipper Williams (born 1954), British cartoonist 
Kipper (musician), born Mark Eldridge
The Kipper Family, or Sid and Henry Kipper, a parody English folk group
The Kipper Kids, or Harry and Harry Kipper, a 1970s performing artist duo
"Mr Kipper", an unknown person of interest in the disappearance of Suzy Lamplugh

Other uses
Kipper (medieval tournament), a person employed by a knight
 Kipper (politics), a supporter of the UK Independence Party
Kipper tie, an unusually wide necktie
AS-2 Kipper, NATO reporting name of the Raduga K-10S Soviet cruise missile

See also

Gipper (disambiguation)
Kipp (disambiguation)
Kip (disambiguation)
Kippah, a cap worn by Jewish males 
"Kipper und Wipper", a 17th-century European financial crisis 
Yom Kippur, the holiest day of the year in Judaism

Lists of people by nickname